The men's individual competition of the triathlon events at the 2019 Pan American Games was held on July 27 at the Agua Dulce in Lima, Peru. The defending Pan American Games champion is Reinaldo Colucci of Brazil.

The Pan American Games triathlon contains three components; a  swim,  cycle, and a  run.

Schedule
All times are Peru Time (UTC-5).

Results
32 competitors from 17 countries were scheduled to compete.

References

Triathlon at the 2019 Pan American Games